Louisa Charmaine Benson Craig (sometimes spelled Luisa Benson; 10 March 1941 – 2 February 2010) was a Burmese-born two-time beauty pageant winner and Karen rebel leader of Jewish and Karen ancestry. 

After going to university in the United States, she returned to Karen State, becoming involved in the Karen National Liberation Army. She left the country for the United States in 1967, after marrying a former classmate and US naval officer.

Early life and education
Louisa Charmaine Benson was born to Saw Benson (also known as Moses Ben-Zion Koder), a Jewish entrepreneur in Rangoon, and his wife Naw Chit Khin, a Karen woman. He was descended on his father's side from the Koder family, a prominent Cochin Jewish business clan in South India's Cochin (now Kochi), and on his mother's side from the Leynado family, a Sephardic Jewish family. Orphaned as a child, Koder was sent to Calcutta to be raised by aunts. He later converted to Christianity. In 1939, after returning to Rangoon, he married. 
 
During World War II, Louisa's parents were separated for lengthy periods as they tried to find safety from the Japanese occupation of Burma. After the war, the independence movement and Karen movement for autonomy resulted in more societal disruption. Louisa went to the United States for college.

Marriage and career
Benson returned to Karen State and in 1964 married Lin Htin, a commander of the Karen National Liberation Army (KNLA). He died in 1965, and she led the Fifth Brigade. She fell out with the Karen National Union leadership following a power struggle with Bo Mya.

As a "Most Wanted" independence warrior leader, Benson was urged by her people in 1967 to flee Burma to save her life. She emigrated to the United States by marrying Glenn Campbell Craig, a former classmate from her overseas studies at Tufts University. A scion of a Mayflower family, Craig had reconnected with her as a U.S. Naval officer after being assigned to Asian waters near Karen State.

After emigrating, Louisa Benson Craig earned a master's degree in international affairs at Columbia University. She worked as an advocate for Burmese democracy and for resettlement of Burmese refugees in the United States. In 2004, she was named a plaintiff in a landmark human rights case against Unocal for profiting from the Burmese military's alleged human rights abuses by operating the Yadana gas field.

Louisa had three children with Glenn Craig. After his naval career, he became an entrepreneur, helping found an international school publications enterprise based in California.

References

1941 births
2010 deaths
American people of Anglo-Burmese descent
American people of Burmese-Jewish descent
American people of Karen descent
American people of Portuguese-Jewish descent
Anglo-Burmese people
Asian Sephardi Jews
Burmese beauty pageant winners
Burmese emigrants to the United States
Burmese Jews
Burmese people of Karen descent
Burmese people of Portuguese-Jewish descent
Cochin Jews
Malayali people
Women in warfare post-1945
Women in war in Southeast Asia